Jamestown Academy may refer to
 Jamestown Academy (New York), school in the United States
 Jamestown Academy (Virginia), school in the United States